Revendrapadu is a village in Guntur District of Andhra Pradesh, India. It is located in Duggirala mandal.

Geography 
Revendrapadu is located at 16°24'22.8" N 80°.37'20.3" E, and lies in Southern India. It borders the Pedavadlapudi to the west, Mellempudi on the north, Nutakki on east and Srungarapuram on south.

Politics 
Revendrapadu Sarpanch is Smt . It comes under Mangalagiri assembly constituency and Guntur parliamentary constituency. Currently MLA of Mangalagiri is Alla Rama Krishna Reddy (YSRCP) and MP of Guntur is Galla JayaDev (TDP).

Education 
The primary and secondary school education is imparted by government, aided and private schools, under the School Education Department of the state. There are no student enrollment in any school of the village.

See also 
Villages in Duggirala mandal

References

Villages in Guntur district